Kathryn Elizabeth Doty (née Hohn; July 15, 1920 – October 14, 2016), also known by her stage name Kathryn Adams or as Kathryn Adams Doty, was an American actress.

Early years 
The daughter of a Methodist minister, Dr. Chris G. Hohn, Doty was born in New Ulm, Minnesota. When she was six, the family moved to Warrenton, Missouri, where her father was chaplain and executive secretary at an orphans' home. After she developed lung problems, she spent two years at a camp in Minnesota. As early as age 13, she took her father's place in the pulpit when he was sick. In a 1939 newspaper article, she recalled: "It was quite a radical thing, in that small town, for a little girl to conduct the church services and preach the sermon, but the congregation understood and were very kind to me."

Doty was a student at Hamline University in Saint Paul, Minnesota, (where she sang in the a cappella choir) and worked as a catalog clerk at the headquarters of Montgomery Ward when an opportunity for an acting career arose. She competed in 1939 in the national finals of the Jesse L. Lasky radio contest Gateway to Hollywood, received a contract, and remained in California to begin a film career under the name of Kathryn Adams.

Film 
Doty debuted on film in Fifth Avenue Girl (1939). One of her more notable roles was as Mrs. Brown, the young mother in Alfred Hitchcock's Saboteur (1942). She co-starred in Sky Raiders (1941), a film serial from Universal Pictures, and had the leading lady role in three Western films in which Johnny Mack Brown starred.

Personal life
She married fellow actor Hugh Beaumont in an Easter wedding on April 13, 1941, at Hollywood Congregational Church. They had three children. After divorcing Beaumont in 1974, she married Fred Doty, and relocated to her native Minnesota. Fred Doty died on January 8, 2011, aged 96. 

She earned a master's degree in educational psychology and had a career as a psychologist, working at the Footlight's Child Guidance Clinic at Hollywood Presbyterian Medical Center and later in Minnesota after she moved back to her home state.

Writing 
While in her 80s, Adams Doty wrote two novels for young adult readers: A Long Year of Silence (2004) and Wild Orphan (2006), both set in New Ulm, Minnesota, during World War I. She was a finalist for the Minnesota Book Award and winner of the 2005 Midwest Book Award. A third book, Becoming the Mother of Me (2009), described her life growing up as a minister's daughter, her trip to Hollywood and her first marriage. 

Writing as Kathryn Doty, she published short stories in Pocket, The Friend and various children's magazines.

Death 
Adams died on October 14, 2016, aged 96.

Partial filmography 

Fifth Avenue Girl (1939) - Katherine Borden
That's Right—You're Wrong (1939) - Mrs. Elizabeth Ralston (uncredited)
The Hunchback of Notre Dame (1939) - Fleur's Companion
Millionaire Playboy (1940) - Betty (uncredited)
If I Had My Way (1940) - Miss Corbett
Ski Patrol (1940) - Lissa Ryder
Love, Honor, and Oh-Baby! (1940) - Susan
Black Diamonds (1940) - Linda Connor
Argentine Nights (1940) - Carol
Spring Parade (1940) - Girl with Fortune Teller (uncredited)
The Invisible Woman (1940) - Peggy
Meet the Chump (1941) - Gloria Mitchell
Nice Girl? (1941) - Bride (uncredited)
Bury Me Not on the Prairie (1941) - Dorothy Walker
Sky Raiders (1941) - Mary Blake
Model Wife (1941) - Salesgirl (uncredited)
Bachelor Daddy (1941) - Eleanore Pierce, aka Jane Smith
Rawhide Rangers (1941) - Jo Ann Rawlings
Unfinished Business (1941) - Katy
Arizona Cyclone (1941) - Elsie
Hellzapoppin' (1941) - Girl (uncredited)
Junior G-Men of the Air (1942) - Grace - Bolt's Girl [Chs. 1, 7] (uncredited)
Saboteur (1942) - Young Mother
You're Telling Me (1942) - Girl (uncredited)
Blonde for a Day (1946) - Phyllis Hamilton (final film role)

References

External links

Kathryn Adams Doty at Edinborough Press

1920 births
2016 deaths
20th-century American actresses
21st-century American novelists
21st-century American women writers
Actresses from Minnesota
21st-century American memoirists
American women novelists
American women psychologists
American film actresses
American historical novelists
People from New Ulm, Minnesota
American women memoirists
Women historical novelists
Novelists from Minnesota
20th-century American novelists
20th-century American women writers
People from Warrenton, Missouri
20th-century American non-fiction writers